Adamas International School is a private school in Rathtala, Kolkata, India. The school was founded in 2004 by the Sachis Kiran Roy Memorial Trust. Mittra Sinha Roy has served as the Principal of the school.

History
The school was founded in 2004 by the Sachis Kiran Roy Memorial Trust.

Curriculum

School Timing 
The school was scheduled to operate for 200 functional days each year conforming the CISCE regulations. The academic terms are spread over two (Term I and Final Term for I - X and for 3 terms for XI to XII) terms.

Boarding schools in West Bengal
International schools in Kolkata
2004 establishments in West Bengal
Educational institutions established in 2004